John Stephenson may refer to:

Politicians
John Stephenson (MP) (c. 1709–1794), British merchant and politician
John Gould Stephenson (1828–1883), American politician and Librarian of Congress
John Bernard Stephenson (1938–1982), Jamaican lawyer and member of parliament
John Stephenson (fl.1571), MP for Hythe

Sports
John Stephenson (baseball) (born 1941), American baseball catcher
John Stephenson (cricketer, born 1903) (1903–1975), English cricketer
John Stephenson (cricketer, born 1907) (1907–1982), English cricketer
John Stephenson (cricketer, born 1965), English Test cricketer
John Stephenson (South African cricketer) (born 1955), South African cricketer
John Stephenson (footballer, born 1881) (1881–1940), Australian rules footballer for Carlton
John Stephenson (footballer, born 1883) (1883–1963), Australian rules footballer for Essendon
John Stephenson (footballer, born 1896) (1896–1976), English footballer
Jack Stephenson (John Samuel Stephenson, 1900–1981), Australian rules footballer for Carlton
Jackie Stephenson (footballer) (1899–1969), English footballer
John Stephenson (footballer, born 1937) (1937–2014), Australian rules footballer for Carlton
John A. Stephenson, English rower

Others
John Stephenson (director) (born 1952), British film director
John Stephenson (actor) (1923–2015), American voice actor
John Stephenson (coachbuilder) (1809–1893), Irish-American coachbuilder who created the street railway 
Chiripula Stephenson (John Edward Stephenson, 1874-?), founder of Ndola
John Stephenson (judge) (1910–1998), English barrister and judge, Lord Justice of Appeal
John Stephenson (physician) (1796–1842), Canadian physician and a co-founder of McGill University Faculty of Medicine
John Stephenson (zoologist) (1871–1933), British surgeon and zoologist
John Atlantic Stephenson (1829–?), Tyneside businessman and poet
John B. Stephenson (1937–1994), Appalachian scholar and president of Berea College
John Robin Stephenson (1931–2003), Lieutenant Colonel of the British Army and Secretary of the Marylebone Cricket Club
John W. Stephenson (1888–1960), English trade union leader
Seán Mac Stíofáin (1928–2001), Irish republican (born John Edward Drayton Stephenson)

See also
John Stevenson (disambiguation)
Jonathan Stephenson (1950–2011), Irish politician
John Steffensen (born 1982), Australian athlete